Takotna Airport  is a state-owned public-use airport located one nautical mile (2 km) north of Takotna, in the Yukon-Koyukuk Census Area of the U.S. state of Alaska.

As per the Federal Aviation Administration, this airport had 206 passenger boardings (enplanements) in calendar year 2008, 128 in 2009, and 190 in 2010. The National Plan of Integrated Airport Systems for 2011–2015 categorized it as a general aviation facility.

Facilities 
Takotna Airport covers an area of 7 acres (3 ha) at an elevation of 422 feet (129 m) above mean sea level. It has one runway designated 4/22 with a gravel surface measuring 4,000 by 75 feet (1,219 x 23 m).

Airlines and destinations

Statistics

References

External links 
 FAA Alaska airport diagram (GIF)
 Topographic map from USGS The National Map

Airports in the Yukon–Koyukuk Census Area, Alaska